Por Ti (English title: For You) is a Portuguese telenovela produced by SP Televisão and broadcast by SIC. It premiered on March 7, 2022. The telenovela is an idea of Artur Ribeiro developed by Alexandre Castro and written too by Alexandre Castro and Joana Andrade, Ana Lúcia Carvalho, Andreia Vicente Martins, Cândida Ribeiro, Filipa Poppe and Manuel Carneiro. It stars Filipa Areosa, Lourenço Ortigão, Rita Blanco, Dalila Carmo, Sandra Faleiro, João Reis, Luís Esparteiro and Duarte Gomes.

Plot 
When Mia decided to quit her promising career as an attorney in the capital, and temporarily move back to her parents’ in search of peace, she would never imagine that she'd be at the centre of a conflict that would change her life.
In the parish of Rio de Meandro there are two villages locked in a perpetual war with each other, now made even worse by the construction project for a dam that will condemn one of them underwater. Their fight for survival will be at the forefront of the savage head to head between Mia's parents, Mónica and Paulo, residing in Aldeia Nova, and Afonso's parents, Helena and parish chairman Rui Guerreiro, residing in Aldeia Velha.
Afonso is a local who had no shortage of women fawning over him, but went away to study engineering in Lisbon. He hasn't come back too often since then. He believes in progress and is kind at heart.

Cast 
 Filipa Areosa as Mia Amado
 Lourenço Ortigão as Afonso Guerreiro
 Rita Blanco as Renata Jones/Joana Pires
 Dalila Carmo as Mónica Amado
 Sandra Faleiro as Helena Guerreiro
 João Reis as Paulo Amado
 Luís Esparteiro as Rui Guerreiro
 Duarte Gomes as Gabriel Almeida Borges
 Alexandra Lencastre as Isabel Brito
 Fernando Luís as Miguel Brito
 Diogo Martins as Nuno Macedo
 Paula Lobo Antunes as Constança Melchior
 Jorge Corrula as José «Zé» Ferreira Pinho
 Mafalda Vilhena as Alexandra «Xana» Ferreira Pinho
 Rui Melo as Bernardo Melchior
 Dânia Neto as Armanda Silva
 João Baptista as António «Tó Calhau» Ferreira Pinho
 Diogo Amaral as Dieter Weissemuller
 Raquel Tavares as Dulce Esperança
 Jorge Mourato as Manuel «Neca» Ferreira Pinho
 Bruno Cabrerizo as Orlando Jesus and Giuseppe Casanova
 Bárbara Lourenço as Mary Louise Blake
 Matilde Reymão as Luísa Melchior
 Maria Emília Correia as Amélia Campos
 João Maria Pinto as Matias Guerreiro
 Carlos Areia as Tomás «Tosso» Soares
 Beatriz Frazão as Rita Melchior
 Simão Fumega as Simão Brito
 Paula de Magalhães as Lara Brito
 Francisca Salgado as Adelaide Soares Costa

Guest stars 
 José Raposo as Eugénio Pereira
 Ruy de Carvalho as Hilário Domingues

Production 
In January 2021, the pre-production for the telenovela began. In the end of the same year, more exactly in November 15, the first scenes began to be filmed in SP Televisão studios and in Cartaxo district, Valada and Vila Chã de Ourique. On June 9, 2022 has been filmed the last scenes of the telenovela.

Ratings 

Premiering with the purpose of raising the audiences left of its predecessor in the time slot (Amor Amor - Vol. 2), Por Ti saw the one of the worst pilot-episode rating of the first track of telenovelas broadcast by SIC, drawing a rating of 9.7 points and audience share of 22.7%.

Since the second episode, the telenovela begins to fail to maintain the lead of audiences, and as of May 30, it was transferred to the second track of telenovelas, where it manages to lead the audience sporadically until got the consolidation of the public and reach the leadership almost every day.

References

External links 

2022 Portuguese television series endings
Portuguese telenovelas
2022 telenovelas
Sociedade Independente de Comunicação telenovelas
Portuguese-language telenovelas
Television shows set in Portugal